Phoenix club or Phoenix Club may refer to:

 Phoenix club (sports), a sports team formed as a successor to a defunct club 
 Phoenix Club, a traditional gentlemen's club and historic building in Cincinnati, Ohio
 The Phoenix Club, a fictional working men's club in Farnworth, Greater Manchester, the setting for Peter Kay's Phoenix Nights
 Phoenix Cricket Club, a cricket club in Dublin, Ireland
 The Phoenix – S K Club, an undergraduate organization at Harvard College
 Phoenix F.C. Navan Road, a football club in Dublin, Ireland
 Phoenix SC, a soccer team in Feasterville, Pennsylvania
 Phoenix Club (Terre Haute, Indiana), a clubhouse building listed on the National Register of Historic Places